Amparo Chuquival Lizana (born 21 February 1992) is a Peruvian footballer who plays as a left back for Sport Girls and the Peru women's national team.

International career
Chuquival represented Peru at the 2008 South American U-17 Women's Championship. At senior level, she was part of the squads at the 2014 Copa América Femenina and the 2019 Pan American Games, but did not play. She appeared in a 0–12 friendly loss to Chile in 2017.

References

1992 births
Living people
Women's association football fullbacks
Women's association football midfielders
Peruvian women's footballers
Sportspeople from Callao
Peru women's international footballers
Pan American Games competitors for Peru
Footballers at the 2019 Pan American Games
Sport Boys footballers
Club Universitario de Deportes footballers